Aitken interpolation is an algorithm used for polynomial interpolation that was derived by the mathematician Alexander Aitken. It is similar to Neville's algorithm.

See also Aitken's delta-squared process or Aitken Extrapolation.

References

External links

Polynomials
Interpolation